Adam Kellerman (born 26 July 1990) is an Australian wheelchair tennis player. When he was thirteen years old, he was diagnosed with a form of cancer called Ewing sarcoma. He represented Australia at the 2012 Summer Paralympics in the men's singles and doubles wheelchair tennis events. As of 21 July 2016 he is ranked Number 1 in Australia and Number 11 in the World for Men's Single Wheelchair Tennis. He competed for Australia at the 2016 Rio Paralympics.

Personal
While dealing with his cancer, he developed an infection that resulted in the removal of his right hip which resulted in limited use of his right leg. His medical condition left him in a state of depression that lasted for two years.

He attended Masada College. In 2010, he won the New South Wales Maccabi Sportsman of the Year. For a brief time, he attended the University of Arizona before leaving university to pursue his tennis career. During his time at University of Arizona, he joined Sigma Alpha Mu fraternity and was very active in his chapter. He occasionally works as a motivational speaker. , he lived in the Sydney area and was a student.

Kellerman is right handed. His father is the Northside Maccabi Football Club president.

Wheelchair tennis

Kellerman is a wheelchair tennis player. When playing, he follows the same rules as his able-bodied counterparts except the ball is allowed to bounce twice. He started playing tennis in December 2006, and took up the sport full-time in 2011.

Kellerman first represented Australia in 2007, and was a member of Australia's junior national team in 2007 and 2008. In 2008, he played some doubles matches with Ben Weekes.

At the beginning of 2012, Kellerman was ranked 61st in the world. By June 2012, he was ranked 29th in the world and number two in Australia. He had worked hard to improve his ranking over the course of the year because only the top 46 ranked players in the world qualified for the Paralympics. In the last half of 2011 and first half of 2012, he participated in 21 different competitions.

Kellerman was selected to represent Australia at the 2012 Summer Paralympics in London, United Kingdom, in the men's singles and the doubles event where he teamed up with Ben Weekes. The Games were his first. He was twenty-one years old at the Games. Prior to competing at the 2012 Summer Paralympics, he had only played wheelchair tennis for five and a half years.

He made the round of 16 in the men's singles and doubles at the London Games.

At the 2016 Rio Paralympics, Kellerman lost to Gustavo Fernández (ARG) 0–2 (1–6, 2–6) in the Men's Singles round of 16 and in the Men's Doubles with Ben Weekes lost in the round of 16.

Recognition
2014 – Tennis Australia Most Outstanding Athlete with a Disability.

References

External links

 
 
 
 
 
 

1990 births
Living people
Australian male tennis players
Australian wheelchair tennis players
Wheelchair category Paralympic competitors
Paralympic wheelchair tennis players of Australia
Wheelchair tennis players at the 2012 Summer Paralympics
Wheelchair tennis players at the 2016 Summer Paralympics
People with paraplegia
Tennis people from New South Wales